South Umpqua High School is a public high school in Myrtle Creek, Oregon, United States.

Academics
In 2008, 68% of the school's seniors received their high school diploma. Of 129 students, 88 graduated, 31 dropped out, 6 received a modified diploma, and 4 are still in high school.

References

High schools in Douglas County, Oregon
Educational institutions established in 1965
Public high schools in Oregon
1965 establishments in Oregon